Dryade  was a 38-gun  of the French Navy.

In 1794, Dryade was at Brest under Ensign Meynene. The next year, under Lieutenant Lafargue, she cruised off Bretagne.

From 1796, she was used as a hulk in Brest harbour, and was eventually scrapped in 1801.

A model of Dryade is on display at the Abbey of Saint-Remi.

References

 

Age of Sail frigates of France
Ships built in France
Hébé-class frigates
1783 ships